Nyamtserengiin Byambasüren (born 30 January 1954) is a Mongolian archer. He competed at the 1976 Summer Olympics and the 1980 Summer Olympics.

References

External links
 

1954 births
Living people
Mongolian male archers
Olympic archers of Mongolia
Archers at the 1976 Summer Olympics
Archers at the 1980 Summer Olympics
Place of birth missing (living people)